The 2010 Australian Men's Curling Championship was held from  ? to ? June2010 at the Naseby Curling Club in Naseby, New Zealand. The winners of this championship will represent Australia at the 2010 Pacific Curling Championships.

Teams
The teams are listed as follows:

Final standings

References

2010 in curling
2010 in Australian sport
Australian Men's Curling Championship
Australian Mixed Curling
Australian Mixed Curling
Australian Mixed Curling
Sport in Otago
Curling competitions in New Zealand